Taylor Wilson (born May 7, 1994) is an American nuclear physicist and science advocate. Wilson achieved controlled nuclear fusion in 2008 when he was 14 years old. He has designed a compact radiation detector to enhance airport security. Wilson works to expand applications for nuclear medicine, and to design and develop modular power reactor technology.

Personal life and education
Taylor Wilson was born in 1994 in Texarkana, Arkansas to Kenneth and Tiffany Wilson. His father is the owner of a Coca-Cola bottling plant, and his mother was a yoga instructor. Wilson was initially interested in rocketry and space science, before entering the field of nuclear science at age 10. He had a lot of support from his parents. He resides in Reno, Nevada.

In June 2012, Wilson was awarded a Thiel Fellowship. The two-year $100,000 fellowship requires recipients to forgo college for the duration of the fellowship. In 2017, Wilson was named a member of the Helena Group, an "elite and edgy" think tank of global leaders focused on executing projects that improve the world.

Scientific projects

Fusion reactor
In 2008, Wilson achieved nuclear fusion using an inertial electrostatic confinement (IEC) device, which was a variation of the fusor, invented by Philo T. Farnsworth in 1964.

Nuclear detection
In May 2010, Wilson entered the Intel International Science and Engineering Fair in San Jose, California, and won several awards for his project titled "Fission Vision: The Detection of Prompt and Delayed Induced Fission Gamma Radiation, and the Application to the Detection of Proliferated Nuclear Materials."

In May 2011, Wilson entered his radiation detector in the Intel International Science and Engineering Fair in Los Angeles, California, against a field of 1,500 competitors and won a US$50,000 award. The project, “Countering Nuclear Terrorism: Novel Active and Passive Techniques for Detecting Nuclear Threats”, won the First Place Award in the Physics and Astronomy Category, Best of Category Award, and the Intel Young Scientist Award. Wilson stated he hopes to test and rapidly field the devices to US ports for counterterrorism purposes.

The U.S. Department of Homeland Security and U.S. Department of Energy offered federal funding to Wilson concerning research he has conducted in building inexpensive Cherenkov radiation detectors.

Fission reactor
On February 27, 2013, at TED 2013, Wilson presented his ideas on the benefits of building small underground nuclear fission reactors that are self-contained and use down-blended uranium and plutonium from decommissioned nuclear weapons as fuel.

In popular culture
He is the subject of the biography The Boy Who Played with Fusion, by Tom Clynes, published in 2015, the movie rights to which have been optioned by 20th Century Fox.

See also
David Hahn
Richard Handl

References

Further reading

External links

 Profile of Taylor Wilson at Popular Science
 March 2012 TED Talk by Taylor Wilson: Yup, I built a nuclear fusion reactor! (time: 3:32)
February 2013 Ted Talk by Taylor Wilson: My radical plan for small nuclear fission reactors. (time: 12:40)

Living people
1994 births
American nuclear engineers
People from Texarkana, Arkansas
People from Reno, Nevada
Thiel fellows
Engineers from Arkansas
Engineers from Nevada